Janyse Jaud (born November 26, 1969) is a Canadian actress, musician and author. Her major voiceover roles include Hulk Versus, My Little Pony, Inuyasha, Ed Edd n Eddy, Batman: Black & White, Baby Looney Tunes, War Planets, Spider-Man Unlimited, and Strawberry Shortcake. She is also the narrator of the Emmy Award-winning television series Adoption Stories. She has worked with companies such as Warner Bros., Alliance Atlantis, Hasbro, Marvel, Paramount, Cartoon Network, and Universal Pictures in both on-camera and voice.

As a singer and songwriter, Jaud has received many awards such as Winner of Best Song ‘This Day Is Mine’ in the Contemporary Christian category at the Hollywood Music in Media Awards, Winner of Best Jazz CD ‘The Magic of Christmas’ at the Toronto Exclusive Magazine Awards, three Nominations at the Hollywood Music in Media Awards for Best Jazz Song ‘That’s What I Love About You’, Best Dance Song ‘Best Friend Forever’, and Best Contemporary Christian Song ‘Dreamers’ as well as two nominations at the Toronto Exclusive Magazine Awards for Best Song ‘Dreamers’ and Artist of the Year, as well as a nomination for Best Children's Song ‘Stomp’ at the Independent Music Awards USA, and a nomination for Best Song ‘Blessed Is This Holy Night’ at the Hollywood Music Awards. She was chosen as a finalist (one of the top 4 rated songwriters) by the Song of the Year international songwriting contest. Jaud also has had many of her original songs chosen for movie soundtracks.

Early life
Jaud grew up in Kelowna, British Columbia. At the age of five, she began training with the Canadian School of Ballet for eleven years. She also studied piano for six years with the Royal Conservatory of Music.

Career
Jaud appeared on-camera in four television series The X-Files, The Outer Limits, Double Exposure and Andromeda.

In 2004, Jaud was the narrator of the Emmy Award-winning series "Adoption Stories" (Discovery Health) and traveled to New York for the event. But it was her voiceover work on the animated series Ed, Edd n Eddy that had the greatest impact. Jaud met children from the Make-A-Wish Foundation who faced life-threatening diseases. After this experience, she created ‘The Magic of Think’ and began writing books, music, nursery rhymes, and videos to help children develop strength and courage.

In 2008, Jaud released her first album in the Christmas music genre. She wrote songs with tongue-in-cheek humour. Many of these jazz songs have been chosen to be in movies such as Blond and Blonder, American Mary, Debbie Macomber's Dashing Through the Snow, and Making Mr. Right.

From 2010 to 2012, Jaud released several singles.

Filmography

Anime
 Adieu Galaxy Express 999 – Metalmena
 Broken Saints – Shandala Nisinu
 Cardcaptors – Natasha Avalon (Sakura's mother, Nadeshiko Kinomoto), Additional Voices
 Cybersix – Lori Anderson, Elaine, Grizelda
 Dragon Ball Z – Social Worker and Chiko (Ocean Dub)
 Fatal Fury: The Motion Picture – Panni Shona (Athena Asamiya's half-sister), Kim Myonsaku 
 Gin Tama - Tae Shimura
 Hamtaro – Female Veterinarian (Episode 71, Uncredited)
 Highlander: The Search For Vengeance – Kyala
 Human Crossing – Delinquent, Kyoshi's Mother
 Inuyasha – Kagura, Kanna, Kagome Hōjō
 Inuyasha: The Final Act – Kagura, Kanna
 Kurozuka – Kuromitsu
 Maison Ikkoku – Akemi Roppongi
 MegaMan NT Warrior – Ms. Mari and Ms. Yuri
 Monster Rancher – Mocchi, Pixie, Granity, Lilim, Poison, Lily
 Night Warriors: Darkstalkers' Revenge – Felicia
 Ogre Slayer – Akane, Isouko, Ryoko
 Ranma ½ – Hinako Ninomiya, Kin Ono, Additional voices
 Saber Marionette – Bloodberry
 The Story of Saiunkoku – Kocho, Lady of the Night 2
 Shakugan no Shana – Margery Daw (Season 1)
 The Vision of Escaflowne – Eriya

 Zoids: Fuzors – Sabre

Animation
 Action Man – Asazi
 The Adventures of Corduroy – Lisa
 The Adventures of T-Rex – Additional Voices
 Alien Racers – Talanna
 Animated Classic Showcase – Various Characters
 Baby Looney Tunes – Baby Melissa
 Barbie as the Princess and the Pauper – Palace Maid
 Batman Black and White (motion comics) – Harley Quinn, Martha Wayne, Madame X, Madelyn Crane, Dr. Marilyn Crane, Waitress, Catwoman, Karen, Tiny Tim, Angelica, Nurse, Mother
 Billy the Cat – Sabrina, Bonnie
 The Bots Master – Lady Frenzy
 Bratz Fashion Pixiez – Cymbeline
 A Chinese Ghost Story: The Tsui Hark Animation – Siu Lan
 Class of the Titans – Medelia, Stephanie
 Conan the Adventurer – Jezmine
 Doggie Daycare – Lula
 Dragon Tales – Eunice, Windy
 Ed, Edd n Eddy – Sarah, Lee Kanker
 Exosquad – Sgt. Rita Torres
 Fat Dog Mendoza – Additional Voices
 For Better or For Worse – Shawna-Marie, Sarah
 Gadget and the Gadgetinis – Sandy O'Nasty
 Galaxy Express 999 – Claire
 G.I. Joe Extreme – Tina, Computer Agent
 Hulk Vs – Lady Deathstrike, Hela
 Hurricanes – Miss Espanola
 The Kids from Room 402 – Melanie, Ms. Shiness
 Kishin Corps: Alien Defender Geo-Armor – Eva Braun, Maria Braun
 Kleo the Misfit Unicorn – Marcia
 Krypto the Superdog – Rosie
 Lapitch the Little Shoemaker – Yana, Marco, Marco's Mother
 Littlest Pet Shop – Phoebe
 A Monkey's Tale – Kom's Mother
 Monster Mash – Spike, Mom
 ¡Mucha Lucha! – Dragonfly, Zebrina Twins
 My Little Pony (G3/G3.5 movies and specials) – Pinkie Pie and Scooter Sprite
 My Little Pony: Friendship Is Magic (G4) - Delivery Pony 1, Innkeeper, Mrs. Trotsworth, Rainy Day
 Ogre Slayer – Akane, Isouko, Ryoko
 ReBoot – Maxine
 Robin and the Dreamweavers – Flit
 RoboCop: Alpha Commando – Jennifer
 Roswell Conspiracies: Aliens, Myths and Legends – Sh'lainn Blaze
 Sabrina: The Animated Series – Leila Leigh, Bosley
 Salty's Lighthouse – Sophie, Sadie
 Shadow Raiders/War Planets – Jewelia
 Skysurfer Strike Force – Cerina, Sliced Ice/Kim
 Space Strikers – Dana
 Spider-Man Unlimited – Lizard Woman
 Strawberry Shortcake's Berry Bitty Adventures – Orange Blossom, Berrykin, Sadie
 Street Fighter – Celia, Mailei, Sachi
 Supernoobs – Additional Voices
 A Tale of Two Kitties – Aunt Lucy
 Tayo the Little Bus – Speedy
 Tom and Jerry Tales – Sherkie
 Trouble Chocolate – Mint
 Trollz – Snarf
 Twisteeria – Loretta Fish, Batty
 Ultimate Book of Spells – Cassy
 The Wacky World of Tex Avery – Raquel, Tour Guide
 X-Men: Evolution – Taryn, Riley's Friend, Amy
 The Power of Animals – Tina Stone

Video games
 Cartoon Network Universe: FusionFall – Lee Kanker
 Devil Kings – Puff (English dub)
 Ed, Edd n Eddy: Jawbreakers – Sarah, Lee Kanker
 Ed, Edd n Eddy: The Mis-Edventures – Sarah, Lee Kanker
 Inuyasha: Feudal Combat – Kagura (English dub)
 Inuyasha: The Secret of the Cursed Mask – Kagura (English dub)

Live-action
 Andromeda – Secretary, Voice Artist, Pax Magellanic Avatar (on camera) / Dawn, Clarion of Loss, Cavava (voice)
 Butterfly on a Wheel – Sarah (voice)
 Double Exposure – Wife
 The Karate Dog – Mary Beth (voice)
 The Outer Limits – Counselor (episode: "Beyond the Veil")
 The X-Files – Nurse

Discography

Studio albums
 The Magic of Think (2008)
 The Magic of Christmas (2008)

Singles
 Dreamers (2008)
 I Had To Say Yes (2010)

References

External links
 
 

1969 births
Living people
Actresses from British Columbia
Canadian child actresses
Canadian child singers
Canadian Christians
Canadian female dancers
Canadian women pop singers
Canadian film actresses
Canadian musical theatre actresses
Canadian performers of Christian music
Canadian pop singers
Canadian television actresses
Canadian video game actresses
Canadian voice actresses
Musicians from Kelowna
20th-century Canadian actresses
21st-century Canadian actresses
20th-century Canadian women singers
21st-century Canadian women singers